Anthony John Pithey (17 July 1933 – 17 November 2006) was a Rhodesian cricketer who played in seventeen Test matches for South Africa between 1957 and 1965. He also made 65 appearances for Rhodesia, captaining them 34 times.  He was a technically correct top-order batsmen who developed a reputation for being a stayer rather than a strokemaker. His early promise saw him represent South Africa as a young player, but he only secured his place in the team toward the end of his career. He toured Australia with Trevor Goddard's Springboks in 1963–64, during which, with his brother David and the Pollocks (Peter and Graeme) he formed part of the first pair of brothers to represent a country in a Test match.

His best series was against Mike Smith's MCC tourists in 1964/65 during which he scored two half-centuries, and his only century, 154 at Newlands during the third Test match. He was selected for the English tour of England in 1965 but withdrew for business reasons and did not play again.

References

External links
 

1933 births
2006 deaths
Cricketers from Mutare
Alumni of Plumtree School
Zimbabwean people of British descent
White Rhodesian people
Deaths from pancreatic cancer
South Africa Test cricketers
South African cricketers
Rhodesia cricketers
Western Province cricketers
South African Universities cricketers
Deaths from cancer in South Africa